A reave is a long and generally straight boundary wall made of stone that was built during the Bronze Age. Reaves were identified as prehistoric features on Dartmoor in Devon, England in 1972, and although they had been described by antiquarians in the 1820s, the knowledge of their origins had been lost, ignored and misrepresented for around 150 years.

There are three main classes of reaves: parallel reaves divided land to create rectilinear fields which were sometimes subdivided by cross reaves. Terminal reaves tend to run for great distances along contours or watersheds and served to divide the enclosed areas from the higher open moor.

There are over 20 major field systems delineated by reaves on Dartmoor. Other large systems are North Dart (over ), South Dart and Easdon Down.

References

Sources

Further reading

Archaeological features
Dartmoor